Daniela Paz Aleuy Young (born 1976, Coyhaique) is a Chilean singer and songwriter.

Biography
Aleuy Young is an artist from Coyhaique, capital of the Aysén Region. She is notable for her role in "Pase lo que pase" on Televisión Nacional de Chile and her 2001 performance at the Viña del Mar International Song Festival. She sang the theme song for Kinnikuman, Pokémon 2000 - The Movie, Tenchi Universe (TV), You're Under Arrest (OAV), and You're Under Arrest (TV). Her 2011 album, EnCerio, was composed, produced and recorded in Mexico.

Discography 
2001, Así soy yo (Warner Music)
2006, Creer (La Oreja)
2011, EnCerio (Independiente)

References

Chilean songwriters
Living people
1976 births
People from Viña del Mar
Women songwriters
21st-century Chilean women singers
Musicians from Viña del Mar